João Baldasserini (born 23 January 1984) is a Brazilian actor. He is best known for his lead role in the Brazilian access primetime telenovela Haja Coração.

Filmography

Television

Film

References

External links 

1984 births
Living people
Brazilian male telenovela actors
Brazilian male television actors
Male actors from São Paulo
Brazilian male film actors